Middlestown is a small village in the Wakefield District in West Yorkshire, England.

History
The villages of Middlestown, Netherton, Overton and Midgley are built around and overlook the Coxley Valley. Whilst the village is not recorded in the Domesday Book, the place-name is recorded as far back as 1322 as Middles(c)hitelington. This was originally Middle Shitlington, the Middle part of that parish, which was renamed to Sitlington in 1929, to avoid the rude inference of the word Shit.

The Middlestown built-up area contains two Nature Reserves, managed by Yorkshire Wildlife Trust, and is also home to the National Coal Mining Museum for England in neighbouring Overton. The population of the built-up area at the 2011 census was 2,366.

The M1 motorway is within  from the village. The A642 road between Huddersfield and Wakefield passes through the village, it was built in the 1830s as a turnpike.

See also
Listed buildings in Sitlington

References

Sources

External links 

 Community Website

Villages in West Yorkshire